Barbados competed in the 2014 Commonwealth Games in Glasgow, Scotland from 23 July – 3 August 2014.

Athletics

Men

Women

Badminton

Men

Women

Mixed

Mixed team

Pool A

Boxing

Men

Cycling

Road

Track

Sprint

Keirin

Time trial

Team sprint

Points race

Scratch race

Judo

Men

Women

Netball

Pool B

Rugby sevens

Barbados replaced Nigeria in the rugby sevens competition after that country withdrew.

Shooting

Men

Swimming

Men

Women

Table tennis

Men

Women

Mixed

Triathlon

Weightlifting

Men

References

Nations at the 2014 Commonwealth Games
2014
Commonwealth Games